Reda Wardi (born 2 August 1995) is a French rugby union player, who plays for Stade Rochelais.

Club career 
Having gone through the Montpellier HR academy, Reda Wardi started his career with the AS Béziers Hérault in Prod D2, before joining the Stade Rochelais in 2019.

International career 
Reda Wardi was first called to the France senior team in October 2022 for the Autumn internationals.

References

External link

1995 births
Sportspeople from Montpellier
Living people
French rugby union players
Rugby union props
Stade Rochelais players